Tyrus McGee (born March 14, 1991) is an American professional basketball player for Galatasaray Nef of the Turkish Basketball Super League and the Basketball Champions League. He has previously played for Iowa State.

College career
The Oklahoma native played collegiately for Arkansas City, Kansas, of the Kansas Jayhawk Community College Conference in the National Junior College Athletic Association from 2009.

He transferred to Iowa State of the Big 12 Conference in 2011. With Iowa State he got averaging 7.9 points, 3.3 rebounds and 0.6 assists in the 2011–12 season, and 13.1 points, 3.5 rebounds and 1.3 assists in the 2012–13 season.

College statistics 

|-
| style="text-align:left;"| 2011–12
| style="text-align:left;"| Iowa State
| 34 || - || 19.9 || .426 || .394 || .839 || 3.3 || .6 || .5 || .2 || 7.7
|-
| style="text-align:left;"| 2012–13
| style="text-align:left;"| Iowa State
| 35 || 2 || 24.0 || .488 || .464 || .820 || 3.5 || 1.3 || 1.1 || .3 || 13.1
|-
| colspan=2 style="text-align:center;"| Career
| 69 || 2 || 22.0 || .465 || .437 || .829 || 3.4 || 1.0 || .8 || .3 || 10.5

Professional career
In 2013 McGee began his European experience. He joined the second league of the Spanish basketball league system LEB Oro side Club Baloncesto Breogán.

In July 2014, McGee signed with Eisbären Bremerhaven in Basketball Bundesliga, Germany. The following year, he went to Orlandina Basket in highest league of the Italian basketball league system LBA, from March 2015 till the end of the 2014–15 season.

The American player signed with Vanoli Cremona on July 24, 2015. In the 2015-16 LBA season he placed 4th in the League Table and reached the playoffs.

On July 22, 2016, McGee signed with Reyer Venezia for the 2016–17 season. During this season with Reyer he won an Italian Championship.

On August 9, 2017, McGee signed with Pistoia Basket.

On July 28, 2018, McGee left Italy after three years and signed with the Turkish Afyon Belediye.

On August 7, 2019, he has signed a contract with Élan Béarnais of the French LNB Pro A. McGee averaged 13.8 points per game. On August 5, 2020, he signed with Hapoel Holon of the Israeli Basketball Premier League.

On July 16, 2021, he signed with San Pablo Burgos of the Spanish Liga ACB. San Pablo Burgos also plays in the Basketball Champions League. McGee averaged 10.5 points, 2.1 assists, and 1.7 rebounds per game but left the team in January 2022.

On January 28, 2022, he signed with Hapoel Holon of the Israeli Premier League, winning the Israeli league championship with the team at the end of that season, and qualifying for the BCL Final Four tournament.

On November 8, 2022, he signed with Galatasaray Nef of the Turkish Basketbol Süper Ligi.

Honours
Reyer Venezia
LBA champion: 2016–17
Dinamo Sassari
FIBA Europe Cup: 2018–19

References

External links
LBA profile 8 March 2017

Federación Española de Baloncesto profile 8 March 2017
Sports Reference profile 8 March 2017

1991 births
Living people
Afyonkarahisar Belediyespor players
American expatriate basketball people in Germany
American expatriate basketball people in Italy
American expatriate basketball people in Spain
American expatriate basketball people in Turkey
American men's basketball players
Basketball players from Oklahoma
CB Breogán players
CB Miraflores players
Cowley County Community College alumni
Dinamo Sassari players
Eisbären Bremerhaven players
Élan Béarnais players
Galatasaray S.K. (men's basketball) players
Hapoel Holon players
Iowa State Cyclones men's basketball players
Junior college men's basketball players in the United States
Lega Basket Serie A players
Liga ACB players
Orlandina Basket players
People from Atoka County, Oklahoma
Pistoia Basket 2000 players
Reyer Venezia players
Shooting guards
Vanoli Cremona players